Garvald is a small settlement on the boundary between the Scottish Borders and South Lanarkshire, Scotland.

References

See also
Garvald, East Lothian
Garvald, Scottish Borders

Villages in South Lanarkshire